Zbigniew Pierzynka (born October 21, 1951 in Kraków, Małopolskie) is a former long-distance runner from Poland, who represented his native country at the 1980 Summer Olympics in Moscow, USSR. He set his personal best (2:12:21) in the classic distance in 1986.

Achievements

References
 sports-reference

1951 births
Living people
Polish male long-distance runners
Athletes (track and field) at the 1980 Summer Olympics
Olympic athletes of Poland
Sportspeople from Kraków
Polish male marathon runners